The English Electric Wren was a 1920s British ultralight monoplane built by the English Electric Company Limited at Lytham St Annes, Lancashire.

History

The Wren, designed by W. O. Manning, was a lightweight motor-glider.  Manning was a designer of flying boats and decided to try a simpler project. The Wren was a single-engined high-wing monoplane with an empty weight of only 232 lb (105 kg). The first aircraft (Serial Number J6973) was built in 1921 for the Air Ministry. Interest in building very light aircraft was encouraged at the time by a £500 prize offered by the Duke of Sutherland (who was the Under-Secretary of State for Air). The entrants had to build the most economical light single-seat aircraft. Another incentive was a £1,000 prize offered by the Daily Mail for the longest flight by a motor-glider with an engine of not more than 750 cc. Two aircraft were built for the 1923 Lympne light aircraft trials in October 1923. The Wren shared the first prize with the ANEC I when it covered 87.5 miles (140.8 km) on one Imperial gallon (4.5 litres) of fuel.

In 1957 the third aircraft was rebuilt using parts of the second aircraft.  It is still airworthy and is on public display at the Shuttleworth Collection at Old Warden Aerodrome in Bedfordshire.

Specifications (Wren)

Notes

References

External links

 The Shuttleworth Collection, English Electric Wren

Wren
Single-engined tractor aircraft
High-wing aircraft
1920s British civil utility aircraft
Aircraft first flown in 1921